Abbé Dominique Peyramale (9 January 18118 September 1877) was a Catholic priest in the town of Lourdes in France during the apparitions of Our Lady of Lourdes to the peasant girl Bernadette Soubirous in 1858.  According to Bernadette, her visions occurred at the grotto of Massabielle, just outside Lourdes. 

Peyramale, under instructions from his bishop, Monsignor Laurence, never visited the grotto during any of the apparitions.  He therefore never saw first-hand the effects that these apparitions produced in Bernadette and the onlookers. Nevertheless, he was deeply involved in the events, interviewing Bernadette on a number of occasions. Initially convinced he was dealing with a childish prank or hoax, Peyramale was eventually convinced that Bernadette's experiences were genuine.

In popular culture

 A street in the town of Lourdes was named after him.
 In the 1943 film The Song of Bernadette, based on Franz Werfel's 1941 novel of the same name, Abbé Peyramale is portrayed by actor Charles Bickford.

See also 

 Lourdes apparitions

1811 births
1877 deaths
People from Lourdes
19th-century French Roman Catholic priests
Our Lady of Lourdes